The Truce of Ulm (also known as the Treaty of Ulm) was signed in Ulm on 14 March 1647 between France, Sweden, and Bavaria. This truce was developed after France and Sweden invaded Bavaria during the Thirty Years' War. Both invading nations forced Maximilian I, Elector of Bavaria, to conclude the truce and renounce his alliance with Emperor Ferdinand III. However, Maximilian broke the truce on 14 September and returned to his alliance with Ferdinand.

References

External links

Ulm
Ulm
1647 in France
Ulm
Ulm
1647 treaties
Treaties of the Swedish Empire
Ulm
Treaties of the Electorate of Bavaria
1647 in Europe
1647 in Sweden
17th-century military history of France